The Phoenix Senators were a minor league baseball team based in Phoenix, Arizona, USA, that played on-and-off from 1915 to 1957. They played in the Rio Grande Association in 1915, the Arizona State League from 1928 to 1930, the Arizona–Texas League from 1931 to 1950 and from 1952 to 1954, the Southwest International League in 1951 and the Arizona–Mexico League (1955–1957). Their home ballparks included Riverside Park and Phoenix Municipal Stadium.

The team became a Baltimore Orioles affiliate in 1954 and the name was changed to the Phoenix Stars. They were replaced by the AAA Phoenix Giants in 1958.

References
Notes

Sources

 Baseball Reference

Defunct minor league baseball teams
Baseball teams established in 1915
Baseball teams disestablished in 1915
Baltimore Orioles minor league affiliates
Professional baseball teams in Arizona
Sports in Phoenix, Arizona
Defunct Arizona-Mexico League teams
Defunct Arizona-Texas League teams
Defunct Southwest International League teams
Defunct Rio Grande Association teams
1915 establishments in Arizona
1957 disestablishments in Arizona
Defunct baseball teams in Arizona
Baseball teams disestablished in 1932
Baseball teams disestablished in 1953
Baseball teams established in 1947
Baseball teams established in 1928
Defunct Arizona State League teams
Arizona State League teams